Helreginn (Old Norse: , "Ruler over Hel" or "Hell-power") is a jötunn in Norse Mythology.

Name 
The Old Norse name Helreginn has been translated as 'Ruler over Hel', or 'Hel-power'. Rudolf Simek comments that the name is unusual, reasoning that it is uncommon for a jötnur to be directly associated with "the underworld."

Attestation 
Helreginn is listed in the þulur section of Skáldskaparmál. Other than the name, no additional information about the figure is provided.

See also
 Hel, daughter of Loki, ruler over the location of the same name

Notes

References

Jötnar